Thomas Goltz (born October 11, 1954) is an American author and journalist best known for his accounts of conflict in the Caucasus region during the 1990s.

Biography

Goltz was born in Japan, raised in North Dakota and graduated from New York University with an MA in Middle East studies. He has worked in and around Turkey and the Caucasus region of the former Soviet Union for the past 30 years. During that period he has become known mainly as a crisis correspondent due to coverage of the war between Azerbaijan and Armenia over Karabakh, the war of secession in Abkhazia from Georgia and the separatist conflict in Chechnya. His documentary for Global Vision's Rights and Wrongs program was a finalist in the Rory Peck Award for excellence in television journalism in 1996.

Goltz speaks German, Turkish, Arabic, Azerbaijani and Russian, and now spends about half the year in the field and half in Montana, where he taught part-time at both the University of Montana in Missoula, and Montana State University in Bozeman, Montana.

His Azerbaijan Diary is an account of Azerbaijan during the years after it separated from the Soviet Union, through to the Karabakh War and the rise of Heydar Aliyev to president of Azerbaijan. Goltz is also the author of Chechnya Diary (the story of the 1995 Samashki massacre), Georgia Diary and, more recently, Assassinating Shakespeare: The True Confessions of a Bard in the Bush, an account of his early travels in Africa performing Shakespeare plays.

His most recent publications in 2021 are "Turkiye" and "Oil Odyssey" the first a collection of essays and analysis  from his many year relationship with that country, and the second a hilarious account of his epically planned, dysfunctionally organized and woefully executed moto-political stunt in the year 2000 to bring the symbolic “first barrel of oil” out of Baku (Azerbaijan) on the Western shore of the Caspian Sea, to Ceyhan in the Eastern Mediterranean coast of Turkey.

Controversy 
The Armenian National Committee of Canada accused Goltz of racism in March 2009 for alleged remarks made at a lecture sponsored by Assembly of Azerbaijani-Canadian Organizations. According to the Armenian National Committee, Goltz characterized the Armenian inhabitants of Nagorno-Karabakh as "garlic-growing Armenians", and selectively mentioned instances of ethnic cleansing by Armenians against Azerbaijanis while omitting mention of cases of ethnic cleansing of Armenians by Azerbaijanis. The Committee also criticized Goltz's alleged praise of Azerbaijan's deceased leader Heydar Aliyev.

Books
Azerbaijan Diary (1998) 
Chechnya Diary (2003) 
Georgia Diary (2006) 
Assassinating Shakespeare: The True Confessions of a Bard in the Bush (2006)

References

External links

1954 births
Living people
21st-century American historians
American male non-fiction writers
American reporters and correspondents
Nagorno-Karabakh
New York University alumni
People from North Dakota
Journalists from North Dakota
21st-century American male writers